Mohammadabad (also Romanized as Moḩammadābād) is a village in Mohammadabad Rural District, Zarach District, Yazd County, Yazd Province, Iran. At the 2006 census, its population was 1,730, in 419 families.

References 

Populated places in Yazd County